Chaunté Wayans (born May 24, 1982) is an American comedian and actress.

Life and career
Chaunté Wayans is a member of the Wayans Family, whose members include Keenen Ivory Wayans, Damon Wayans, Sr., Kim Wayans, Shawn Wayans, and Marlon Wayans, and her brother Damien Dante Wayans.  She is the daughter of Elvira Wayans.

Chaunté’s first entered the film industry as a production assistant, working on Americanizing Shelley, and on some of her uncles' productions including Scary Movie 2 and My Wife and Kids.  She later appeared as herself in the TLC series Trading Spaces. She made her feature film debut in 2009, alongside several extended family members in the movie Dance Flick, in the role of Free Gas Pedestrian.

In 2013, Chaunté appeared on the MTV2 television series Wild 'n Out.

Filmography
 Trading Spaces (2007)
 Dance Flick (2009)
 Wild 'n Out (2013)
 They Ready (2019)
 Laff Mobb’s Laff Tracks (2020)
AJ and the Queen (2020)
Headliners (2022)

References

External links

1982 births
African-American actresses
African-American stand-up comedians
American stand-up comedians
American film actresses
American film editors
American women comedians
Living people
Chaunte
21st-century American actresses
21st-century American comedians
American LGBT comedians
American women film editors
21st-century American screenwriters
African-American female comedians
21st-century African-American women writers
21st-century American women writers
21st-century African-American writers
20th-century African-American people
21st-century American LGBT people
20th-century African-American women